The 1998 Alaska gubernatorial general election took place on November 3, 1998. The election resulted in a landslide for the Democratic incumbent, Tony Knowles, who had won the 1994 gubernatorial election by only 536 votes. Knowles was the first incumbent governor to attain re-election since 1978 and the last until 2022. , this was the last time a Democrat was elected Governor of Alaska.

Candidates 
Incumbent Democratic governor Tony Knowles was up for re-election. On the Republican side, three major candidates jockeyed for the nomination: businessman John Howard Lindauer, state senator Robin L. Taylor, and Wayne A. Ross. Lindauer won the open primary election, with Taylor coming in second. Jim Sykes, founder of the Green Party of Alaska, ran on that party's ticket, but Desa Jacobsson later replaced him on the ballot. Ray Metcalfe, a defecting Republican who had founded the Republican Moderate Party of Alaska, also ran.

Campaign 
Lindauer's campaign faltered late into the race as a result of his failure to disclose that his wife, a wealthy Chicago lawyer, had financed the bulk of his campaign. As a result of this revelation, the Republicans withdrew their support of Lindauer and backed Robin Taylor, the runner-up of the Republican primary, as a write-in candidate.   Due to the lateness of this change, the Republicans unsuccessfully attempted to obtain a court order to delay the election. The collapse of Lindauer's campaign resulted in a three-way split of the Republican vote between him, Taylor, and the Republican Moderate Metcalfe.

Knowles defeated Taylor, his closest opponent, by 33%, the widest margin of victory for a gubernatorial candidate in Alaska history.  Moreover, if Taylor's and Lindauer's totals are added together, Knowles defeated the two Republicans combined by 16% – still the widest margin in Alaska history until 2010.  This was also the first time since 1970 that any candidate won an outright majority of the vote in an Alaska gubernatorial election.

Results

Republican primary

General election

References 

Governor
1998
Alaska